San Dieguito Lagoon State Marine Conservation Area (SMCA) is a marine protected area near Del Mar in San Diego County on California’s south coast.

The lagoon
The SMCA covers a small area of coastal and inland lagoon habitat. The SMCA protects marine life by limiting the removal of marine wildlife from within its borders. San Dieguito Lagoon SMCA prohibits take of all living marine resources except recreational take of finfish by hook-and-line from shore and the Grand Avenue bridge. Boating, swimming, wading, and diving are prohibited within the conservation area.

No person, except state and local law enforcement officers, fire suppression agencies and employees of the department in the performance of their official duties or persons possessing written permission from the department, shall be permitted on the California least tern nesting island.

No person, except state and local law enforcement officers, fire suppression agencies and employees of the department in the performance of their official duties or persons possessing written permission from the department, shall enter this conservation area between 8:00 p.m. and 5:00 a.m.

The County of San Diego, after consultation with the department, may carry out management activities for fish and wildlife, flood control and vector control. Authorized operation and maintenance activities shall include, but shall not be limited to, use of chemicals, vegetation control, water control and use of associated equipment.

Collections of fish, wildlife, water and soil may be made by the department for the purposes of fish and wildlife management or by San Diego County for the purposes of water quality testing and vector control.

History
San Dieguito Lagoon SMCA is one of 36 new marine protected areas adopted by the California Fish and Game Commission in December, 2010 during the third phase of the Marine Life Protection Act Initiative. The MLPAI is a collaborative public process to create a statewide network of protected areas along California's coastline.

The south coast's new marine protected areas were designed by local divers, fishermen, conservationists and scientists who comprised the South Coast Regional Stakeholder Group. Their job was to design a network of protected areas that would preserve sensitive sea life and habitats while enhancing recreation, study and education opportunities.

The south coast marine protected areas went into effect in 2012.

Geography and natural features
San Dieguito Lagoon SMCA is located near Del Mar, CA.

This area consists of waters below the mean high tide line within the San Dieguito Lagoon Ecological Reserve.

Habitat and wildlife
This area protects estuarine/lagoon habitat and associated species.

Recreation and nearby attractions

Scientific monitoring
As specified by the Marine Life Protection Act, select marine protected areas along California's south coast are being monitored by scientists to track their effectiveness and learn more about ocean health. Similar studies in marine protected areas located off of the Santa Barbara Channel Islands have already detected gradual improvements in fish size and number.

References

External links 
Marine Life Protection Act Initiative
CalOceans

Lagoons of San Diego County, California
Protected areas of San Diego County, California
Protected areas established in 2010
2010 establishments in California